Gug Tappeh (also Romanized as Gūg Tappeh and Gowg Tappeh; also known as Gog Tappeh) is a Kurdish village in Mokriyan-e Sharqi Rural District of the Central District of Mahabad County, West Azerbaijan province, Iran. At the 2006 National Census, its population was 4,377 in 877 households. The following census in 2011 counted 6,436 people in 1,608 households. The latest census in 2016 showed a population of 6,947 people in 1,886 households; it was the largest village in its rural district.

References 

Mahabad County

Populated places in West Azerbaijan Province

Populated places in Mahabad County